Louise Joy Brown (born 25 July 1978) is an English woman who was the first human to have been born after conception by in vitro fertilisation experiment (IVF). Her birth, following a procedure pioneered in Britain, has been lauded among "the most remarkable medical breakthroughs of the 20th Century".

Birth and early life
Louise Joy Brown was born at Oldham General Hospital, Lancashire, by planned Caesarean section performed by registrar John Webster. She weighed 5 pounds, 12 ounces (2.608 kg) at birth. Her parents, Lesley and John Brown, had been trying to conceive naturally for nine years, but Lesley faced complications of blocked fallopian tubes.

On 10 November 1977, Lesley Brown underwent a procedure, later to become known as in vitro fertilisation (IVF), developed by Patrick Steptoe, Robert Edwards and Jean Purdy. Purdy was the first to see her embryonic cells dividing. Edwards, as the only surviving partner, was awarded the 2010 Nobel Prize in Medicine for this work. In March 2022 a plaque was installed on  Royal Oldham Hospital to record the importance of Sister Muriel Harris and Jean Purdy to the work. 
Although the media referred to Brown as a "test tube baby", her conception actually took place in a Petri dish. Her younger sister, Natalie Brown, was also conceived through IVF four years later, and became the world's 40th child after conception by IVF. In May 1999, Natalie was the first human born after conception by IVF to give birth herself—without IVF.

Career and family life
In 2004, Brown married nightclub doorman Wesley Mullinder. Dr. Edwards attended their wedding. Their first son, conceived naturally, was born on 20 December 2006.

Brown's father died in 2006. Her mother died on 6 June 2012 in Bristol Royal Infirmary at the age of 64 due to complications from a gallbladder infection.

Ethical and religious issues

Although the Browns knew the procedure was experimental, the doctors did not tell them that no case had yet resulted in a baby. This has raised questions of informed consent.

In 1978, when asked for his reaction to Brown's birth, the patriarch of Venice, Cardinal Albino Luciani (later Pope John Paul I), expressed concerns about the possibility that artificial insemination could lead to women being used as "baby factories", but also refused to condemn the parents of the child, noting they simply wanted to have a baby.

Publications

References

External links
 BBC profile of Louise Brown (July 2003)
 The Lesley Brown Collection, 1970 to circa 2015, at Bristol Archives

1978 births
Living people
In vitro fertilisation
People from Oldham
20th-century English women
21st-century English women